Jordan Sonnenblick (born July 4, 1969) is an American writer of young adult fiction. He is a graduate of New York City's Stuyvesant High School (1987), and of the University of Pennsylvania.

Personal life 

Jordan Sonnenblick was born on July 4, 1969 in Fort Leonard Wood. He is from Staten Island, New York. In high-school, he worked as both a tutor and a summer camp counselor. In 1994, after graduating from college, he married his wife and moved to Pennsylvania with her. He now resides in Bethlehem, Pennsylvania with his wife and children.  He frequently visits schools all over the United States, and sometimes internationally, to talk about his books.

Career 

Sonnenblick taught 5th grade in Houston, Texas for three years, and 8th grade English at Hackettstown and Phillipsburg Middle Schools in New Jersey for eleven years, before he retired to concentrate on writing books. His first novel, Drums, Girls, and Dangerous Pie, was inspired by one of his students, whose brother was battling cancer. He has always wanted to be an author and also plays the guitar, drums, and bass.

Books
 Drums, Girls, and Dangerous Pie (2004)
 Notes from the Midnight Driver (2006)
 Dodger for Sale (2010)
 After Ever After (2010)
 Curveball: The Year I Lost My Grip (2012)
 Are You Experienced? (2013)
 Zen and the Art of Faking it (2015)
 Falling Over Sideways (2016)
 The Secret Sheriff of Sixth Grade (2017)

References

External links

 

1969 births
Living people
American children's writers
American young adult novelists
American male novelists
People from Fort Leonard Wood, Missouri